The 2011–12 Swedish Figure Skating Championships were held at the Isstadion in Malmö between December 15 and 18, 2011. Skaters competed in the disciplines of men's singles, ladies' singles, and pair skating on the senior, junior, and novice levels. The results were among the criteria used to choose the teams to the 2012 World Championships and 2012 European Championships.

Senior results

Men

Ladies

Pairs

External links
 2011–12 Swedish Championships results

Swedish Figure Skating Championships 2011-2012
Swedish Figure Skating Championships 2011-2012
Swedish Figure Skating Championships
Figure Skating Championships 2011-2012
Figure Skating Championships 2011-2012
Sports competitions in Malmö
2010s in Malmö